John Thomas Walton (October 8, 1946 – June 27, 2005) was an American war veteran and a son of Walmart founder Sam Walton. He was also the chairman of True North Venture Partners, a venture capital firm. Walton cofounded the Children's Scholarship Fund, providing tuition scholarships for disadvantaged youth.

Early life and service in the Vietnam War
Walton was born in Newport, Arkansas. He graduated from Bentonville High School where he was a star football player. Walton went on to attend the College of Wooster in Wooster, Ohio. He dropped out of college in 1968 to spend more time playing the flute and enlisted in the U.S. Army (after the Vietnamese Tet Offensive).

During the Vietnam war, Walton served in the Green Berets as part of the Studies and Observations Group. He was involved in combat in the A Shau Valley and in Laos, where he was the medic and second-in-command of a unit named "Spike Team Louisiana". Walton later received a Silver Star for bravery in combat.

Later life
After returning from Vietnam, Walton learned to fly and went to work as a pilot for Walmart. He later left the company to fly crop-dusters over cotton fields in several southern states and co-founded Satloc, an aerial application company that pioneered the use of GPS technology in agricultural crop-dusting. Walton then moved to San Diego where he founded Corsair Marine, a company that built trimaran sailboats. He also lived in Durango, Colorado, and was an enthusiastic skier, mountain biker, hiker, motorcycle rider, skydiver and scuba diver.

In 1998, as part of the Philanthropy Roundtable, Walton and friend Ted Forstmann established the Children's Scholarship Fund to provide tuition assistance for low-income families to send their children to private schools. He was an advocate of school vouchers. For his achievements, he received the William E. Simon Prize for Philanthropic Leadership.

Death

Walton died on June 27, 2005, when the CGS Hawk Arrow home-built ultralight aircraft (registered as an "experimental aircraft" under FAA regulations) that he was piloting crashed in Jackson, Wyoming. Walton's plane crashed at 12:20 p.m. local time (1820 GMT) shortly after taking off from Jackson Hole Airport.

The National Transportation Safety Board later reported that Walton had improperly reinstalled the rear locking collar on the elevator control torque tube. This allowed the torque tube to move rearward during his flight and loosened the elevator control cable tension. The outcome of the failed repair was an inflight loss of pitch control, without which Walton could not control the aircraft's altitude.

Shortly before his death, Forbes magazine had estimated Walton's net worth to be  billion, tied with his brother Jim as the 4th richest person in the United States and 11th-richest person in the world.

Walton was survived by his wife Christy and their son Lukas. He was previously married to Mary Ann Gunn, who later became a judge in Arkansas. He had two brothers, S. Robson Walton and Jim Walton and a sister, Alice Walton.

See also
 Forbes list of billionaires (2004)
 Walton family

References

External links

 
 Forbes.com: Forbes World's Richest People 2004
 Genealogy of the Walton family

1946 births
2005 deaths
Accidental deaths in Wyoming
American businesspeople in retailing
United States Army personnel of the Vietnam War
Aviators killed in aviation accidents or incidents in the United States
College of Wooster alumni
People from Newport, Arkansas
Bentonville High School alumni
People from Bentonville, Arkansas
Recipients of the Silver Star
Members of the United States Army Special Forces
John T.
Businesspeople from Arkansas
Businesspeople from Wyoming
20th-century American philanthropists
United States Army soldiers
20th-century American businesspeople
Victims of aviation accidents or incidents in 2005